Nathaniel Prescott Wei Wah Lee (born May 6, 1994) is a Guamanian football player who plays as a defender.

College career
After leaving the Pennsylvania State University in 2015, Lee enrolled at the High Point University in 2016.

International career
Despite being born in Maryland in the United States, Lee chose to represent Guam at international level, as he is eligible through his grandmother. He made his senior debut in a 0–1 defeat by Hong Kong in 2015.

Personal life
Lee has two brothers, Alex and Justin, who have both also represented Guam at international level. All three made their debut in the same game against Hong Kong.

International statistics

References

External links
 High Point University profile

1994 births
Living people
American soccer players
Association football defenders
Guam international footballers
Guamanian footballers
High Point Panthers men's soccer players
Penn State Nittany Lions men's soccer players
People from Derwood, Maryland
Soccer players from Maryland
Sportspeople from Montgomery County, Maryland